The 1978 Formula 750 season was the sixth season of the FIM Formula 750 World Championship and the second season to have full world championship status. Despite Kenny Roberts being the racer with most wins on aggregate, Johnny Cecotto was crowned champion after finishing seven races among the top three.

Championship standings

References

See also
 1978 Grand Prix motorcycle racing season

Formula 750
Formula 750